The 3rd Dallas-Fort Worth Film Critics Association Awards, given in January 1998, honored the best filmmaking of 1997.

L.A. Confidential by director Curtis Hanson won the award for Best Picture. Titanic earned the award for Best Director (James Cameron). The Wings of the Dove won the two female acting awards (Leading Role: Helena Bonham Carter and Supporting Role: Alison Elliott).

Winners
Best Actor: 
Peter Fonda - Ulee's Gold
Best Actress: 
Helena Bonham Carter -  The Wings of the Dove
Best Director: 
James Cameron - Titanic
Best Picture: 
L.A. Confidential
Best Supporting Actor: 
Burt Reynolds - Boogie Nights
Best Supporting Actress: 
Alison Elliott - The Wings of the Dove

References

External links
Dallas-Fort Worth Film Critics Association official website

1997
1997 film awards
1998 in Texas